Dictyonota fuliginosa is a species of lace bug in the  family Tingidae. It is found in Europe and Northern Asia (excluding China) and North America.

References

Further reading

 
 

Tingidae
Insects described in 1853